Nainital district is a district in Kumaon division which is a part of Uttarakhand state in India.  The headquarters is at Nainital.

Nainital District is located in Kumaon Division, and is located in the lower Himalayas. Haldwani is the largest city in the district.

Geography 
The district borders Almora and Champawat districts to the north, Udham Singh Nagar district to the south, and Bijnor district of Uttar Pradesh and Pauri Garhwal district to the west.

Nainital district is located in the Kumaon Himalaya. The district has part of the Bhabar tract in its south, which is bordered to the north by the Sivalik hills. To the north of this is the Lesser Himalayas, with a maximum altitude of 2600m. The main river in the district is the Kosi, which forms part of the border between Almora and Nainital districts before entering Nainital district proper. It then flows through Nainital district to the Ramganga.

History 
The southern Terai part of the district was ruled by the Panchalas during the Vedic era. Starting the first century CE, the district was part of the Kushan empire for at least 150 years. In the fourth century, Samudragupta conquered the region and the Guptas held it for the next two centuries.

After the downfall of the Kingdom of Brahmapura, the Katyuris from Joshimath established their rule over most of Kumaon including the Bhabhar parts. Starting in the middle of the 10th century, however, their power began to decline and they were eclipsed by the Chand kings of Champawat. The Chand kings generally had friendly relations with the empires to their south, but were never under their direct political control. The Chand rulers fought many wars with the Garhwal kingdom to their west. In 1790, the Gorkhas overran Kumaon including Nainital district and held it for 24 years, until the British took it in 1814 during the Anglo-Nepalese War. The region came under direct British rule and was organised into Nainital district in 1891 as part of the United Provinces.

In 1916, Govind Ballabh Pant and Har Govind Pant established the Kumaon Parishad to fight for the grassroots of Kumaoni people. After Independence, Nanital district became part of the state of Uttar Pradesh. In 2000, Nainital district was one of the districts separated to form the new state of Uttarakhand.

Demographics
According to the 2011 census, Nainital district has a population of 954,605. It has a sex ratio of 934 females for every 1000 males, and a literacy rate of 83.9%. Scheduled Castes and Scheduled Tribes make up 20.02% and 0.79% of the population respectively.

 Indian census, Nainital district had 809,717 (84.82%) Hindus, 120,742 (12.65%) Muslims, and 17,419 (1.82%) Sikhs.

Languages 

At the time of the 2011 Census of India, the major first languages of the population were Kumaoni (%), Hindi (%), Urdu (%), Punjabi (%), Garhwali (%), Bhojpuri (%), and Nepali (%). There are also speakers of Buksa, found in a number of villages in Ramnagar development block.

Assembly Constituencies

Lalkuan
Bhimtal
Nainital (SC)
Haldwani
Kaladhungi
Ramnagar

Villages
 

Simalkha

References

External links

 
 Nainital District at Govt. of Uttarakhand website

 
Districts of Uttarakhand
Minority Concentrated Districts in India